Boundary Dam is a concrete arch gravity-type hydroelectric dam, finished in 1967, on the Pend Oreille River, in the U.S. state of Washington. The dam is located in the northeast corner of Washington state. It is operated by Seattle City Light  and makes up a significant portion of the City of Seattle's energy portfolio. On average, it provides upwards of 46% of the power generated by Seattle City Light. Boundary Powerhouse, located adjacent to the dam, is completely built inside of the rock that makes up the left abutment of the dam itself. It has a nameplate capacity of just over 1 gigawatt of generation.  The component of the hydroelectric project were listed on the National Register of Historic Places in 2018.

The 1997 film The Postman was partially filmed at the dam. A facade of the town (Bridge City in the film) appeared on the face of the dam for a period of time that year.

See also

List of dams in the Columbia River watershed

References

Dams in Washington (state)
Seattle City Light dams
Hydroelectric power plants in Washington (state)
Buildings and structures in Pend Oreille County, Washington
United States power company dams
Dams completed in 1967
Energy infrastructure completed in 1967
Dams on the Pend Oreille River
Arch-gravity dams
National Register of Historic Places in Pend Oreille County, Washington
Dams on the National Register of Historic Places in Washington (state)